Dumuria is a village and a Gaon Panchayat in Barpeta district in the Indian state of Assam.

History
Dumuria served as the second capital of the Bijni kingdom, a branch of the Koch dynasty. The capital had been located in a village now known as Bijni until it was attacked in 1864 by Jhawlia Mech, a chieftain from Bhutan. This event was followed by the Assam earthquake of 1897 which severally damaged the royal palaces of Dumuria. In search of a safe haven, the capital was temporarily relocated to Jogighopa before finally settling in the Deohati forest area which was later renamed as Abhayapuri.

Administration
The Bajali district headquarters in Madon Rauta Nagar comes under area jurisdiction of Dumuria village.

Demographics
 India census, Dumuria had a population of 1367. Males constitute 50% (683) of the population and females 50% (684).Total number of Household is 251. Dumuria has an average literacy rate of 81%, higher than the national average of 59.5%: male literacy is 85%, and female literacy is 76%. In Dumuria, 10% of the population is under 6 years of age.

100% of the population is ethnic Assamese people and they speak Assamese.

Dumuria has total six chuburi namely, 1. Sarihapara 2. Hathipara 3. Gohainpara 4. Nadipara 5. Natun Dumuria 6. Dakhkhinhati

Boundary

It is around 3 km west from Pathsala Town

Education
Dumuria has High School, ME School, Primary School

References

Cities and towns in Barpeta district
Barpeta